Numbers 1 & 2 is a 1967 album by Lester Bowie featuring a line-up which later became the Art Ensemble of Chicago. It was released on the Nessa label and features performances by Bowie, Roscoe Mitchell, Malachi Favors, and Joseph Jarman.

Reception
The Allmusic review by Scott Yanow awarded the album 3 stars, stating, "The pretty spontaneous music often wanders and rambles a bit, reaching some surprising conclusions and showing expert use of space; very advanced for 1967".

Track listing
Side one
 "Number 1" (Bowie/Favors/Mitchell) - 21:37  
Side two
 "Number 2" (Mitchell) - 24:27
"Number 1" recorded August 11, 1967, "Number 2" recorded August 25, 1967 at Sound Studios.

Personnel
Roscoe Mitchell: alto saxophone, soprano saxophone, flute, recorder, gourd, bells, gong
Lester Bowie: trumpet, flugelhorn, steer horn, kelp horn
Malachi Favors: bass, kazoo
Joseph Jarman: alto saxophone, soprano saxophone, clarinet, bassoon, bells (on "Number 2")

References

1967 albums
Lester Bowie albums
Nessa Records albums
Art Ensemble of Chicago albums